A bronze statue of Alexander Hamilton by James Earle Fraser, dedicated on May 17, 1923, is found on the south patio (Alexander Hamilton Place, NW) of the U.S. Treasury Building in Washington, D.C.

Description
Alexander Hamilton was born on January 11, 1755, or 1757, in Charlestown, the capital of the island of Nevis, in the Leeward Islands. Commissioned in 1917 and cast by the Kunst Foundry, the statue depicts Hamilton holding a tricorn hat and a long dress coat in his hands. In the statue, he is clad in knee breeches, a throat fichu, buckled shoes, and ruffled cuffs. Charles Atlas posed for this statue.

Inscriptions

The base of the statue is inscribed on three sides.
  
The front reads:
ALEXANDER HAMILTON

1757—1804

FIRST SECRETARY OF THE TREASURY

SOLDIER, ORATOR, STATESMANCHAMPION OF CONSTITUTIONAL UNION,REPRESENTATIVE GOVERNMENT ANDNATIONAL INTEGRITY

The rear of the statue reads:
Fraser 1922
A. Kunst Foundry NY 

The north face reads:
"He smote the rock of the national resources and abundant streams of revenue gushed forth. He touched the dead corpse of the public credit and it sprang upon its feet."

Access
Access to the statue is now restricted as a result of security upgrades after the September 11th attacks.

See also
 List of public art in Washington, D.C., Ward 2

References

External links

Alexander Hamilton (Washington D.C. (District of Columbia)), wikimapia
"Alexander Hamilton Statue ", C-SPAN
https://www.flickr.com/photos/wallyg/136352725/
http://www.hmdb.org/marker.asp?marker=32740

1923 sculptures
Statues of Alexander Hamilton
Artworks in the collection of the National Park Service
Bronze sculptures in Washington, D.C.
President's Park
Outdoor sculptures in Washington, D.C.
Sculptures of men in Washington, D.C.
Statues in Washington, D.C.
Works by James Earle Fraser (sculptor)